Mayamycin is a cytotoxic polyketide isolated from a marine Streptomyces.

References

Polyketides
Tetracyclic compounds
Oxygen heterocycles